John E. Lewis (born 25 July 1949) is a former Australian rules footballer who played with Hawthorn in the Victorian Football League (VFL).

Lewis, who played at Claremont before and after his VFL stint, broke into the Hawthorn side late in the 1970 season. A full-back, he appeared in their last three games of the year and then returned to Claremont. In 1975 he represented Western Australia at interstate football.

References

Holmesby, Russell and Main, Jim (2007). The Encyclopedia of AFL Footballers. 7th ed. Melbourne: Bas Publishing.

1949 births
Living people
Australian rules footballers from Western Australia
Hawthorn Football Club players
Claremont Football Club players